The 2015 The Princess Maha Chackri Sirindhon's Cup was a stage race held in Thailand, with a UCI rating of 2.2, from 8 April to 10 April 2015. The race was won by Hong Kong's Meng Zhaojuan.

Stages

Stage 1
8 April 2015 – Udon Thani to Nong Khai,

Stage 2
9 April 2015 – Nong Khai to Nong Khai,

Stage 3
10 April 2015 – Nong Khai to Udon Thani,

Classification leadership table

References

See also
2015 in women's road cycling

2015 in women's road cycling